Rassvet is the name of several  rural localities in Russia.

Altai Krai
As of 2010, three rural localities in Altai Krai bear this name:
Rassvet, Khabarsky District, Altai Krai, a settlement in Martovsky Selsoviet of Khabarsky District
Rassvet, Romanovsky District, Altai Krai, a settlement in Rassvetovsky Selsoviet of Romanovsky District
Rassvet, Talmensky District, Altai Krai, a settlement in Kurochkinsky Selsoviet of Talmensky District

Astrakhan Oblast
As of 2010, one rural locality in Astrakhan Oblast bears this name:
Rassvet, Astrakhan Oblast, a selo in Rassvetsky Selsoviet of Narimanovsky District

Republic of Bashkortostan
As of 2010, six rural localities in the Republic of Bashkortostan bear this name:
Rassvet, Belebeyevsky District, Republic of Bashkortostan, a village in Rassvetovsky Selsoviet of Belebeyevsky District
Rassvet, Buzdyaksky District, Republic of Bashkortostan, a selo in Gafuriysky Selsoviet of Buzdyaksky District
Rassvet, Davlekanovsky District, Republic of Bashkortostan, a selo in Rassvetovsky Selsoviet of Davlekanovsky District
Rassvet, Iglinsky District, Republic of Bashkortostan, a village in Krasnovoskhodsky Selsoviet of Iglinsky District
Rassvet, Meleuzovsky District, Republic of Bashkortostan, a village in Meleuzovsky Selsoviet of Meleuzovsky District
Rassvet, Miyakinsky District, Republic of Bashkortostan, a village in Bikkulovsky Selsoviet of Miyakinsky District

Bryansk Oblast
As of 2010, one rural locality in Bryansk Oblast bears this name:
Rassvet, Bryansk Oblast, a village in Maltinsky Selsoviet of Karachevsky District

Chelyabinsk Oblast
As of 2010, one rural locality in Chelyabinsk Oblast bears this name:
Rassvet, Chelyabinsk Oblast, a settlement in Fershampenuazsky Selsoviet of Nagaybaksky District

Republic of Dagestan
As of 2010, one rural locality in the Republic of Dagestan bears this name:
Rassvet, Republic of Dagestan, a selo in Ullubiyevsky Selsoviet of Tarumovsky District

Irkutsk Oblast
As of 2010, one rural locality in Irkutsk Oblast bears this name:
Rassvet, Irkutsk Oblast, a settlement in Osinsky District

Kaliningrad Oblast
As of 2010, one rural locality in Kaliningrad Oblast bears this name:
Rassvet, Kaliningrad Oblast, a settlement in Dobrinsky Rural Okrug of Guryevsky District

Republic of Kalmykia
As of 2010, one rural locality in the Republic of Kalmykia bears this name:
Rassvet, Republic of Kalmykia, a settlement in Khulkhutinskaya Rural Administration of Yashkulsky District

Kaluga Oblast
As of 2010, one rural locality in Kaluga Oblast bears this name:
Rassvet, Kaluga Oblast, a village in Duminichsky District

Kemerovo Oblast
As of 2010, two rural localities in Kemerovo Oblast bear this name:
Rassvet, Novokuznetsky District, Kemerovo Oblast, a settlement in Bungurskaya Rural Territory of Novokuznetsky District
Rassvet, Topkinsky District, Kemerovo Oblast, a settlement in Solominskaya Rural Territory of Topkinsky District

Kirov Oblast
As of 2010, one rural locality in Kirov Oblast bears this name:
Rassvet, Kirov Oblast, a settlement in Korlyakovsky Rural Okrug of Sanchursky District

Krasnodar Krai
As of 2010, three rural localities in Krasnodar Krai bear this name:
Rassvet, Anapsky District, Krasnodar Krai, a khutor in Gaykodzorsky Rural Okrug of Anapsky District
Rassvet, Starominsky District, Krasnodar Krai, a settlement in Rassvetovsky Rural Okrug of Starominsky District
Rassvet, Yeysky District, Krasnodar Krai, a khutor in Aleksandrovsky Rural Okrug of Yeysky District

Krasnoyarsk Krai
As of 2012, one rural locality in Krasnoyarsk Krai bears this name:
Rassvet, Krasnoyarsk Krai, a settlement in Rassvetovsky Selsoviet of Birilyussky District

Kurgan Oblast
As of 2010, one rural locality in Kurgan Oblast bears this name:
Rassvet, Kurgan Oblast, a selo in Rassvetsky Selsoviet of Mokrousovsky District

Kursk Oblast
As of 2010, one rural locality in Kursk Oblast bears this name:
Rassvet, Kursk Oblast, a village in Vablinsky Selsoviet of Konyshyovsky District

Leningrad Oblast
As of 2010, one rural locality in Leningrad Oblast bears this name:
Rassvet, Leningrad Oblast, a logging depot settlement in Vakhnovokarskoye Settlement Municipal Formation of Lodeynopolsky District

Lipetsk Oblast
As of 2010, one rural locality in Lipetsk Oblast bears this name:
Rassvet, Lipetsk Oblast, a settlement in Lebyazhensky Selsoviet of Izmalkovsky District

Republic of North Ossetia–Alania
As of 2010, one rural locality in the Republic of North Ossetia–Alania bears this name:
Rassvet, Republic of North Ossetia–Alania, a selo in Rassvetsky Rural Okrug of Ardonsky District

Novgorod Oblast
As of 2010, one rural locality in Novgorod Oblast bears this name:
Rassvet, Novgorod Oblast, a village under the administrative jurisdiction of the urban-type settlement of Uglovka, Okulovsky District

Omsk Oblast
As of 2010, one rural locality in Omsk Oblast bears this name:
Rassvet, Omsk Oblast, a village in Bolshakovsky Rural Okrug of Lyubinsky District

Orenburg Oblast
As of 2010, one rural locality in Orenburg Oblast bears this name:
Rassvet, Orenburg Oblast, a settlement in Akzharsky Selsoviet of Yasnensky District

Oryol Oblast
As of 2010, two rural localities in Oryol Oblast bear this name:
Rassvet, Mtsensky District, Oryol Oblast, a settlement in Anikanovsky Selsoviet of Mtsensky District
Rassvet, Verkhovsky District, Oryol Oblast, a settlement in Russko-Brodsky Selsoviet of Verkhovsky District

Rostov Oblast
As of 2010, four rural localities in Rostov Oblast bear this name:
Rassvet, Aksaysky District, Rostov Oblast, a settlement in Rassvetovskoye Rural Settlement of Aksaysky District
Rassvet, Tselinsky District, Rostov Oblast, a khutor in Yulovskoye Rural Settlement of Tselinsky District
Rassvet, Vesyolovsky District, Rostov Oblast, a khutor in Verkhnesolenovskoye Rural Settlement of Vesyolovsky District
Rassvet, Yegorlyksky District, Rostov Oblast, a khutor in Rogovskoye Rural Settlement of Yegorlyksky District

Ryazan Oblast
As of 2010, one rural locality in Ryazan Oblast bears this name:
Rassvet, Ryazan Oblast, a settlement in Pesochinsky Rural Okrug of Putyatinsky District

Samara Oblast
As of 2010, two rural localities in Samara Oblast bear this name:
Rassvet, Stavropolsky District, Samara Oblast, a settlement in Stavropolsky District
Rassvet, Volzhsky District, Samara Oblast, a selo in Volzhsky District

Saratov Oblast
As of 2010, one rural locality in Saratov Oblast bears this name:
Rassvet, Saratov Oblast, a settlement in Rovensky District

Smolensk Oblast
As of 2010, one rural locality in Smolensk Oblast bears this name:
Rassvet, Smolensk Oblast, a village in Chistikovskoye Rural Settlement of Rudnyansky District

Stavropol Krai
As of 2010, one rural locality in Stavropol Krai bears this name:
Rassvet, Stavropol Krai, a settlement in Gorkovsky Selsoviet of Novoalexandrovsky District

Sverdlovsk Oblast
As of 2010, two rural localities in Sverdlovsk Oblast bear this name:
Rassvet, Kamyshlovsky District, Sverdlovsk Oblast, a settlement in Kamyshlovsky District
Rassvet, Slobodo-Turinsky District, Sverdlovsk Oblast, a settlement in Slobodo-Turinsky District

Tambov Oblast
As of 2010, two rural localities in Tambov Oblast bear this name:
Rassvet, Staroyuryevsky District, Tambov Oblast, a settlement in Vishnevsky Selsoviet of Staroyuryevsky District
Rassvet, Tokaryovsky District, Tambov Oblast, a village under the administrative jurisdiction of Tokaryovsky Settlement Council of Tokaryovsky District

Tomsk Oblast
As of 2010, one rural locality in Tomsk Oblast bears this name:
Rassvet, Tomsk Oblast, a settlement in Tomsky District

Tula Oblast
As of 2010, two rural localities in Tula Oblast bear this name:
Rassvet, Leninsky District, Tula Oblast, a settlement in Rassvetovsky Rural Okrug of Leninsky District
Rassvet, Venyovsky District, Tula Oblast, a settlement in Rassvetovsky Rural Okrug of Venyovsky District

Tver Oblast
As of 2010, one rural locality in Tver Oblast bears this name:
Rassvet, Tver Oblast, a settlement in Likhoslavlsky District

Tyumen Oblast
As of 2010, two rural localities in Tyumen Oblast bear this name:
Rassvet, Isetsky District, Tyumen Oblast, a selo in Rassvetovsky Rural Okrug of Isetsky District
Rassvet, Omutinsky District, Tyumen Oblast, a settlement in Zhuravlevsky Rural Okrug of Omutinsky District

Ulyanovsk Oblast
As of 2010, one rural locality in Ulyanovsk Oblast bears this name:
Rassvet, Ulyanovsk Oblast, a crossing loop in Tiinsky Rural Okrug of Melekessky District

Vladimir Oblast
As of 2010, one rural locality in Vladimir Oblast bears this name:
Rassvet, Vladimir Oblast, a village in Gorokhovetsky District

Volgograd Oblast
As of 2010, three rural localities in Volgograd Oblast bear this name:
Rassvet, Ilovlinsky District, Volgograd Oblast, a settlement in Medvedevsky Selsoviet of Ilovlinsky District
Rassvet, Kotelnikovsky District, Volgograd Oblast, a settlement in Poperechensky Selsoviet of Kotelnikovsky District
Rassvet, Leninsky District, Volgograd Oblast, a settlement in Rassvetinsky Selsoviet of Leninsky District

Vologda Oblast
As of 2010, one rural locality in Vologda Oblast bears this name:
Rassvet, Vologda Oblast, a village in Volokoslavinsky Selsoviet of Kirillovsky District

Voronezh Oblast
As of 2010, one rural locality in Voronezh Oblast bears this name:
Rassvet, Voronezh Oblast, a settlement in Petrovskoye Rural Settlement of Pavlovsky District